Coincy is a commune in the Moselle department in Grand Est in north-eastern France.

See also
Communes of the Moselle department

References

Communes of Moselle (department)